Three Stars ("Se Setare") was a special Nowruz and New Year program of IRIB TV3 in 2014, 2016 and 2017, performed and produced by Ehsan Alikhani. This program selected the best TVs of the year with popular votes and was broadcast in 2014, 2016 and 2017 from March until the New Year. The first season of the program started on 1 March 2014 and ended on 20 March 2014, The second season started on 5 March 2016 and ended on 20 March 2016 and the third season started on 4 March 2017 and ended on 20 March 2017. This program was one of the most watched New Year programs of IRIB.

About program 
With the presence of the Three Stars elected by the people, along with dozens of prominent figures from the fields of cinema, television, sports, music, as well as the young elites of the country, this program was the special program of IRIB TV3's New Year program. Various sections were also broadcast in various scientific and cultural fields.

Title music

References 

2014 Iranian television series debuts
2010s Iranian television series